The Gzhelian is an age in the ICS geologic timescale or a stage in the stratigraphic column. It is the youngest stage of the Pennsylvanian, the youngest subsystem of the Carboniferous. It follows the Kasimovian age/stage and is followed by the Asselian age/stage, the oldest subdivision of the Permian system.

The Gzhelian is more or less coeval with the Stephanian Stage of the regional stratigraphy of Europe.

Name and definition 
The Gzhelian is named after the Russian village of Gzhel, nearby Ramenskoye, not far from Moscow. The name and type locality were defined by Sergei Nikitin (1851–1909) in 1890.

The base of the Gzhelian is at the first appearance of the Fusulinida genera Daixina, Jigulites and Rugosofusulina, or at the first appearance of the conodont Streptognathodus zethus. The top of the stage (the base of the Permian system) is at the first appearance of the conodont Streptognathodus isolatus within the Streptognathus "wabaunsensis" chronocline.  higher in the reference profile, the Fusulinida species Sphaeroschwagerina vulgaris aktjubensis appears.

At the moment (2008), a golden spike for the Gzhelian Stage is yet lacking.

Biozones 
The Gzhelian Stage is subdivided into five biozones, based on the conodont genus Streptognathodus:
 Streptognathodus wabaunsensis and Streptognathodus bellus Zone
 Streptognathodus simplex Zone
 Streptognathodus virgilicus Zone
 Streptognathodus vitali Zone
 Streptognathodus simulator Zone

References

External links 
 Carboniferous timescale at the website of the Norwegian network of offshore records of geology and stratigraphy
 Gzhelian, GeoWhen Database

 
Pennsylvanian geochronology
Geological ages